"El Incomprendido" (English: "Misunderstood") is a Dembow Guaracha fusion song by Puerto Rican singer-songwriter Farruko and Colombian producer Victor Cardenas and the dominican Dj Adoni. It was released as single on October 1, 2021 from Farruko's studio album La 167, via Sony Music Latin.

Composition
The track follows "Pepas" musical style, and remakes Alice Deejay's "Better Off Alone" (1999) and David Guetta's Play Hard (2012), and performs in Spanish. The song is written in the key of B major, with a tempo of 128 beats per minute.

Music video
An accompanying music video was released on October 1, 2021, The video is recorded "in a kind of open party using a large number of people to do the choreography" that is already going viral on social networks, it has received over 12 million views.

Charts

Weekly charts

Year-end charts

Certifications

See also
List of Billboard Hot Latin Songs and Latin Airplay number ones of 2022

References

2021 singles
2021 songs
Farruko songs
Sony Music Latin singles